British Columbia Toll Highways and Bridges Authority was a government organization in the Province of British Columbia; this provincial governmental organization has long since been dissolved. Six of the longest Bridges were built for this agency and they include:
 The George Massey Tunnel (known as the Deas Island Tunnel when built); opened in 1959 and cost about $25 million
 The Oak Street Bridge; opened in 1957 and cost about $9 million
 The Agassiz-Rosedale Bridge; opened in 1956 and cost about $5 million
 The Ironworkers Memorial Second Narrows Crossing (known as the Second Narrows Bridge when built); opened in 1960
 The Nelson Bridge; opened in 1957 and cost about $4 million
 Purchased from the Guinness companies in 1955, the Lions Gate Bridge

Any and all bridges under the control of the British Columbia Toll Highways and Bridges Authority were transferred over to the British Columbia Ministry of Transportation.

References

External links 
Vancouver Archives BC Toll Highways and Bridges Authority

Defunct organizations based in Canada
Toll road operators
Transport in British Columbia